Christ Church Cathedral is the name of many cathedrals around the world, and may refer to:

Australia
 Christ Church Cathedral, Grafton, an Anglican cathedral in the Clarence Valley Council, New South Wales
 Christ Church Cathedral, Newcastle, an Anglican cathedral in the City of Newcastle, New South Wales

Bahamas
Christ Church Cathedral, Nassau; a cathedral in the Bahamas

Canada
 Christ Church Cathedral (Vancouver), British Columbia
 Christ Church Cathedral (Victoria, British Columbia)
 Christ Church Cathedral (Fredericton), New Brunswick
 Christ's Church Cathedral (Hamilton, Ontario)
 Christ Church Cathedral (Ottawa), Ontario
 Christ Church Cathedral (Montreal), Quebec
 Christ Church Cathedral (Whitehorse), Yukon Territory

Falkland Islands
 Christ Church Cathedral (Falkland Islands)

Ireland
 Christ Church Cathedral, Dublin
 Christ Church Cathedral, Waterford

New Zealand
 ChristChurch Cathedral, Christchurch
 Cathedral of the Blessed Sacrament, Christchurch, seat of the Roman Catholic Diocese of Christchurch
 Christ Church Cathedral, Nelson

Tanzania
 Christ Church, Zanzibar, Stone Town

United Kingdom
 Cathedral and Metropolitical Church of Christ at Canterbury, mother church of the Anglican Communion, formerly known as Christ Church, Canterbury
 Christ Church Cathedral, Oxford, England (also the college chapel of Christ Church, Oxford)
 Christ Church Cathedral School, Oxford, England
 Christ Church Cathedral, Lisburn, Northern Ireland

United States

Alabama
 Christ Church Cathedral (Mobile, Alabama)

Connecticut
 Christ Church Cathedral (Hartford, Connecticut)

Indiana
 Christ Church Cathedral (Indianapolis)

Kentucky
 Christ Church Cathedral (Lexington, Kentucky)
 Christ Church Cathedral (Louisville, Kentucky)

Louisiana
 Christ Church Cathedral (New Orleans)

Massachusetts
 Christ Church Cathedral (Springfield, Massachusetts)

Missouri
 Christ Church Cathedral (St. Louis, Missouri)

Ohio
 Christ Church Cathedral (Cincinnati)

Tennessee
 Christ Church Cathedral (Nashville, Tennessee)

Texas
 Christ Church Cathedral (Houston)

Wisconsin
 Christ Church Cathedral (Eau Claire, Wisconsin)

See also
 Christ Cathedral (disambiguation)
 Christ Church (disambiguation)
 Christchurch (disambiguation)